Pulavar Kuzhanthai (1 July 1906 – 22 September 1972) is a Tamil poet and writer. He has written many Tamil books in prose and poetry form. Kuzhanthai is inspired by the Dravidian movement, Periyar E. V. Ramasamy and Annadurai C N.

Ravana Kaaviyam
His epic, Ravana Kaaviyam, is a panegyric on Ravana. The book is made of 3100 poetic stanzas in which Ravana is the Protagonist. The book was released in 1946. The book was banned by the then ruling Congress government. The ban was lifted only in 1971 by the then Chief Minister of Tamil Nadu, M. Karunanidhi.

Nationalisation of works
In 2006, the Tamil Nadu government gave Rupees 500,000 to Kuzhanthai's heir and nationalised his literary works meaning his works are now in public domain.

References

Tamil-language writers
1906 births
1972 deaths
People from Erode district
20th-century Indian poets
Poets from Tamil Nadu
Indian male poets
20th-century Indian male writers